This is a summary of the year 2007 in British music. It was the first year of digital downloads being fully integrated into the charts, leading to many songs not given physical releases to enter the chart on download sales alone. Leona Lewis had the most successful single of the year with "Bleeding Love", which achieved sales of 787,652 copies. Her album Spirit became the fastest-selling debut album of all time in the UK. Rihanna spent ten weeks at number one with "Umbrella", the longest stay for any artist at number 1 for thirteen years and the second best selling single of the year, and Amy Winehouse had the biggest selling album of the year with Back to Black.

Summary

January 
2007 began with the introduction of new chart rules meaning that all songs legally downloaded over the internet can count towards chart positions, whether or not a "physical" version of a song is available to purchase. Although Leona Lewis stayed at number one in her first week, the change was felt further down the charts with songs such as "Crazy" by Gnarls Barkley, "Maneater" by Nelly Furtado, "You Don't Know" by Eminem all returning to the charts on downloads alone. 
Also, as a result of downloads being eligible at any time, JoJo charted at number twenty-two with "Too Little Too Late", two weeks before physical release. Since then, various other songs have charted long before their CD release, including The Fray, whose "How to Save a Life" charted at number 29 on 21 January, two months before the CD's release. As a result, the CD release date was brought forward by a month.

Mika topped the singles chart on 21 January to knock Leona Lewis off the top with the song "Grace Kelly" with sales around 30,000, to become only the second song (after Gnarls Barkley's "Crazy") to go to #1 exclusively via download sales. Just Jack climbed to number two with "Starz in Their Eyes" and The View at three with "Same Jeans". Chris Moyles, BBC Radio 1 Breakfast DJ, decided to test the new chart rules by selecting a random track for the public to download (legally) to see if it would chart. The track was "Honey to the Bee" by Billie and it reached number 17 on 21 January on downloads alone.

On 31 January, German dance group Cascada released their second single, a cover of "Truly Madly Deeply", which entered the charts at #17 solely on downloads and then went on to peak at #4.

March
Kaiser Chiefs claimed their first #1 album with Yours Truly, Angry Mob, which stayed at the top for two weeks despite a challenge by Arcade Fire's second album Neon Bible. Take That claimed their 10th #1 single with "Shine", replaced two weeks later by Sugababes vs. Girls Aloud, who collaborated on the official Comic Relief single "Walk This Way". The single earned Sugababes their fifth #1 single, and Girls Aloud their third. Ray Quinn, who came second in the third series of The X Factor, went to #1 in the album charts with his album of swing covers, Doing It My Way. German dance group Cascada also released their first album, Everytime We Touch, which peaked at #2 and ended up being the UK's 22nd best selling album of the year.

April
Scottish duo The Proclaimers managed to score three weeks at the top of the singles chart with the unofficial Comic Relief single, "I'm Gonna Be (500 Miles)" with Brian Potter and Andy Pipkin, selling over 200,000 copies to date. American rock band Kings of Leon recorded their first #1 album in the UK with their third album, Because of the Times. American producer Timbaland went to #1 with "Give It to Me", which was also at the top at the same time in the States. "Give It to Me" was an all-star collaboration with both Nelly Furtado and Justin Timberlake. Another all-star collaboration replaced Timbaland at #1, with both Beyoncé and Shakira climbing to the top with "Beautiful Liar", which gave both Beyoncé and Shakira their second UK #1 within a year and also Beyoncé her third #1 as a solo artist. The Arctic Monkeys' first single from their second album Favourite Worst Nightmare, "Brianstorm", reached #2, behind Beyonce and Shakira's #1 hit.

Avril Lavigne charted with The Best Damn Thing giving her a third UK #1 album. It is only the second time that a female solo artist has ever scored three #1's in the UK with her first three albums, following Let Go (#1 in 2003) and Under My Skin (#1 in 2004). Norah Jones has also achieved this feat with her first three albums.

May
McFly gained their seventh #1 single with "Baby's Coming Back/Transylvania", but the song fell to #20 and then #39 the following week, tying the record for the biggest fall from #1 with Elvis Presley. Rihanna went to #1 for the first time with "Umbrella" — a collaboration with Jay-Z — and would remain on top for the rest of the month. Linkin Park and Maroon 5 both got #1 albums in May, with Minutes to Midnight and It Won't Be Soon Before Long respectively.

June
The month of June began with Rihanna being at the #1 spot for both the singles and download chart. Her third album Good Girl Gone Bad also made it to the top in the albums chart. The White Stripes reached #2 with their single "Icky Thump". The 7" format of the single went on to become the UK's biggest selling 7" single in twenty years, which was partly due to a tie in with XL Records and NME (who had given away a free foldout 7" of new song "Rag and Bone", with space to include the "Icky Thump" 7"). The Traveling Wilburys went to #1 for the first time with The Traveling Wilburys Collection, followed by The White Stripes with their sixth album Icky Thump. Britain's most successful girl group the Spice Girls reformed and announced a global tour and Greatest Hits album. Muse played a record, sold-out two night concert in Wembley Stadium on the 16th and 17th of this month. Paul McCartney released his album Memory Almost Full on the 5th.

July
Editors went to #1 for the first time with their second album An End Has a Start. They would be followed by #1 albums from The Chemical Brothers (We Are the Night), The Enemy (We'll Live and Die in these Towns) and Britain's Got Talent winner Paul Potts, whose album One Chance was the first since Maroon 5's It Won't Be Soon Before Long to spend more than one week at #1.

On 10 July, German Eurodance Group Cascada released their 3rd single Miracle. It entered at #57 and then went on to peak at #8, making it their 3rd consecutive top ten single.

On 22 July, Rihanna's "Umbrella" secured ten weeks at #1. In doing so, it overtook Gnarls Barkley's "Crazy" as the longest runner at #1 in the 21st Century and became one of the most successful R&B/Hip-Hop singles of all time. The title also cursed the British summertime which was one of the wettest in living memory.

After a massive ten weeks at #1, Rihanna was finally replaced by Timbaland's second #1 single of the year, "The Way I Are", featuring newcomers Keri Hilson and D.O.E., whilst Kate Nash stayed at #2 with her official debut single "Foundations".

August
The record for the shortest single to ever chart was broken, when Hans Zimmer's "Spider Pig", from The Simpsons Movie soundtrack, entered the chart at #24. The running time for the song is a mere 1:04.

Swedish singer Robyn earns her first UK top 40 #1, with the song "With Every Heartbeat". In the same week, Kate Nash made it to #1 in the albums chart with her debut album, Made of Bricks. Hip-Hop act Kanye West debuts at #3 in the singles chart with "Stronger" based on downloads alone, and then also in the same week being the #1 of the downloads chart. "Stronger" rose to #1 in the singles chart the following week and stayed there for 2 weeks.

Seventeen-year-old Sean Kingston makes his British chart debut at #2 in the chart on downloads alone with Beautiful Girls.

September
On 2 September, Sean Kingston moves one place up the chart from #2 and earns his first #1 with the single "Beautiful Girls", Sean believes that he was inspired by music from his hero Jay-Z. One week later Hard-Fi triumphantly return with their second album Once Upon a Time in the West reaching #1 on 9 September. On the day of release the band played at Virgin Megastore in Oxford Street where they signed copies of the album. During the evening of the same day, the band played an exclusive gig at Maida Vale Studios, London.

Girls Aloud returned to the charts with "Sexy! No, No, No..." which made it to #5, but fell 2 places to #7 the week after. They entered into the Guinness Book Of World Records, for having the most consecutive Top 10 hits in the UK for an all-female group.

In the Air Tonight by Phil Collins re-entered the chart at #17 after many years, due to its use in the new UK Cadburys Dairy Milk advert.

On 30 September, Radio 1 held a special UK Singles Chart edition for 40 years of Radio 1. Bruno Brookes and Mark Goodier, past presenters of the UK Singles Chart, played the biggest singles ever in the singles chart and showed highest stats from artists including Britney Spears, Gnarls Barkley, Will Young, Hear'Say, Bryan Adams, Rihanna and Eminem.

On this same day, Sugababes earned their sixth number one single with first single from their fifth studio album, "About You Now". Also, the Sugababes were the second artist (after Timbaland) to have two singles at number one in 2007.

At 36 seconds long, "The Ladies' Bras" by Jonny Trunk & Wisbey became the shortest ever single to enter the UK Singles Chart, charting at number 27 on 30 September, breaking the record just a few weeks after "Spider Pig".

October

Steve Hewitt, Placebo's drummer of 11 years, left the band as a result of "personal and musical differences...", as quoted on the Placebo website

On 6 October the Sugababes managed to hold on to the top spot with "About You Now". Jennifer Lopez and The Stereophonics both made returns to the chart at numbers 11 and 12 with the singles "Do It Well" and "It Means Nothing" respectively. Kate Nash's second single failed to match the success of her debut, as "Mouthwash" peaked at number 23 (just two places ahead of "Foundations" after 15 weeks on the charts).

On 7 October, JK and Joel hosted their final chart show, giving their chart show shoes to Fearne Cotton and Reggie Yates.

Bruce Springsteen hit number one for the seventh time on the UK album charts with new album Magic.

In a controversial move, Radiohead released their new album "In Rainbows" online, and allowed their fans to download it for any set price they want from £0.00-£100. The Charlatans announce that they are to follow suit, by releasing their album for free from XFM's website in 2008. They release "You Cross My Path" as a free mp3 through the XFM site.

The Verve unleash their first new material for 10 years, a 14-minute demo known as "The Thaw Session" as a free MP3 through NME's website, for 1 week only.

On 21 October Britney Spears entered the UK Singles Chart at #3 after 2 years away from the music scene. Stereophonics earned their fifth number one album with Pull the Pin.

On 28 October, Leona Lewis achieved her second number-one single with "Bleeding Love", having sold 218,000 copies in its first week, the highest first-week sales of the year so far. Online downloads reached an all-time high of 1.7 million in a week.  Leona also became the third artist in 2007 to have her second number one after Timbaland & Sugababes. On the issue date of October 28 the top five consisted of all British performers/acts, and first three places were new-entries.
 #1. Leona Lewis - Bleeding Love
 #2. Take That - Rule the World
 #3. McFly - The Heart Never Lies
 #4. Sugababes - About You Now
 #5. Mark Ronson & Amy Winehouse - Valerie

November
On 4 November, The Eagles beat Britney Spears to number one on the Album Chart, and on 11 November, Westlife earned another number one album with Back Home. Boyz II Men came back to the UK with a new album which went to #8.

On 11 November, Spice Girls, Kylie Minogue, Nickelback and Celine Dion returned to the charts due to download sales, with Spice Girls entering at number 20 with "Headlines (Friendship Never Ends)". Minogue entered the charts after two years away with "2 Hearts" at number 12, and Nickelback entered at number 34 with "Rockstar". Dion entered the chart with "Taking Chances" at number 40. Girls Aloud entered the top 10 on downloads alone and rose to 3 a week later on November 11.

November 11 also saw the first performance of the World Requiem, by John Foulds, in 81 years (since 1926).

Nicole Scherzinger's debut single "Baby Love" moved up the chart to #14 to give her her highest peak.

On 18 November, Leona Lewis earned her fourth week at number one with "Bleeding Love", having become the biggest selling single of the year to date. She also became the first artist to have two singles stay at number one for 4 or more weeks in the 2000s (decade) ("Bleeding Love" and "A Moment Like This"). Her debut album Spirit entered the album chart at number one, being the fastest selling debut album and the fourth fastest selling album of all time.

Led Zeppelin's classic song "Stairway To Heaven" charts at #37 for the first time, after their back catalogue and greatest hits album "Mothership" appears on iTunes. Despite the band's incredible fame, their lack of British single releases means that the band had only been in the UK Top 40 once previously.

Soulja Boy Tell 'Em, who had been #1 in the United States for 7 weeks with his single "Crank That (Soulja Boy)," entered the UK Singles Chart on downloads alone at #24.

December 
On 2 December, Leona Lewis earned her sixth week at number one with "Bleeding Love".

On 9 December Leona earns her seventh week at number one as "Bleeding Love" continues to sell well, selling over 700,000 copies thus far. "Bleeding Love" is now in joint 3rd place for Most Weeks At The top Of The Charts. Her album Spirit has so far sold 1,146,246 copies and has gone 3× platinum in just under a month. "Bleeding Love" was the joint third longest number one of the 21st Century so far.

Mariah Carey enters into the top ten for the first time in two years as seasonal favourite "All I Want for Christmas Is You" reaches number eight via downloads. "Crank That (Soulja Boy)" enters at number ten also via downloads for Soulja Boy Tell 'Em which topped the US Chart for six weeks back in the autumn.

On 10 December German Dance Group Cascada enter the top 10 with "What Hurts The Most" (which peaked at #10) after entering at #16 on downloads alone. This was also their 4th top ten single.

On 16 December, singer/songwriter Katie Melua earned her first UK number one single with a duet with Eva Cassidy. It's a cover of Louis Armstrong's classic "What a Wonderful World". All proceeds from the single will go to the Red Cross charity. The song was only available from supermarket chain Tesco. Christmas spirit also returned to the charts as Mariah Carey got to number one on downloads but only number four (behind Eva Cassidy & Katie Melua, Leona Lewis & Soulja Boy Tell 'Em) with "All I Want for Christmas Is You" in the combined chart. The Pogues also charted well, getting to number eight during their third week in the chart (on downloads alone) with Fairytale of New York. Wham!, Wizzard, Andy Williams, Slade, Shakin' Stevens, Band Aid, Chris Rea and John Lennon also provided a festive feel to the top 40. T2 featuring Jodie Aysha slipped to number nine after two weeks at number two.

On the 'Christmas Chart', Kylie Minogue entered at number 32 on downloads alone with her single "Wow" while the Sugababes climbed up thirteen places to number 13 with "Change" after the physical release. Also, Rihanna had three singles in the Top 40, ("Umbrella" at 38, "Hate That I Love You" at 37, and "Don't Stop the Music" at 30), the latter being on downloads alone. X Factor winner Leon Jackson topped the Christmas chart with "When You Believe". This marks the third year in a row that an X Factor winner tops the Christmas chart (Shayne Ward "That's My Goal" did it in 2005 and Leona Lewis repeated it in 2006 with "A Moment Like This"). Leona Lewis topped the Christmas album charts with her debut album "Spirit" for the sixth week.

In the last singles chart of the year Leon Jackson and "When You Believe" remained at number one for a second week, with Leona Lewis climbing back to number two with "Bleeding Love". There were also a number of re-entries from some of the biggest selling singles of the year in the post-Christmas rush, as consumers looked to fill newly purchased digital music players. In the album chart Leona Lewis completed her seventh week at number 1 with "Spirit", with Westlife's "Back Home" holding steady at 2 and Take That climbing back up to 3 with "Beautiful World".

It was also announced by the Official Chart Company that Amy Winehouse had the biggest selling album of the year with "Back To Black" selling 1,586,194 copies. Leona Lewis who had the second biggest selling album with "Spirit" selling 1,550,037 copies in the 48 days since its release. Mika's "Life in Cartoon Motion" was the third biggest selling album of the year. Leona Lewis had the biggest selling single of 2007 with "Bleeding Love" (787,652), with Rihanna's "Umbrella" at number two (512,730), and Mika's "Grace Kelly" in third position.

Radiohead's In Rainbows finally got a physical CD release on 31 December 2007 after causing controversy within the music industry upon initial release as a download only on 10 October 2007. The public were asked to pay whatever they wanted for the record (including nothing) and despite this the CD release would still go on to be the first Number One in the Official Chart Company's album chart for 2008.

Charts

Number-one singles

Number-one single downloads

Number-one albums

Number-one compilation albums

Number-one album downloads

Year-end charts

Best-selling singles of 2007

Best-selling albums of 2007

Best-selling compilation albums of 2007

Notes:

See also 
List of UK Dance Chart number-one singles of 2007
List of UK Indie Chart number-one singles of 2007
List of UK Rock Chart number-one singles of 2007

References 

 Top 200 singles of 2007

Charts
United Kingdom
British record charts